Terrorgruppe is a German punk rock band from Berlin founded in 1993.
  The band split up for the first time in 2005.  They reunited in 2013 and broke up again in 2022. The band is known for its live performances, involving various on-stage gags and audience participation.  They are known for playing at the Chaostage in Hannover in 1995, and wrote the song "Wochenendticket" about the experience.

Discography

Studio albums
 Musik für Arschlöcher CD (1995, Gringo/Metronome) LP (Teenage Rebell)
 Music for Assholes MC (1996, Pop Noise, only released in Poland)
 Musik für Leute wo gern trinken Pipi (1996, Teenage Rebell)
 Melodien für Milliarden CD (1996, Gringo) LP (Teenage Rebell)
 15 Punkcerialien LP (1997, Gringo/Alternation)
 Keiner hilft euch LP (1998, Gringo Records)
 Über Amerika CD (1999, Byo (Cargo Records))
 1 World 0 Future (2000, Epitaph Records)
 Fundamental (2003, Destiny/Aggropop)
 Rust in Pieces (2006, Destiny/Aggropop)
 Inzest im Familiengrab (2014, Destiny/Aggropop)
 Tiergarten (2016, Destiny/Aggropop)
 Jenseits von Gut und Böse (2020, Destiny/Aggropop)

Singles
 "Dem deutschen Volke" (7-inch / 1993)
 "Arbeit" (7-inch / 1994) (Work)
 "Fickparty 2000 zur Lust verdammt" (7-inch / 1994)
 "Die Gesellschaft ist Schuld" (split 7-inch / 1994)
 "Keine Airbags für die CSU!" (MCD / 1995)
 "Kinderwahnsinn"(MCD / 1995)
 "Kreuzberg zuerst" (MCD / 1995)
 "Der Rhein ist tot" (MCD / 1996)
 "Wochenendticket" (MCD / 1996)
 "Rockgiganten vs. Strassenköter" (split single / 1996)
 "Sretni smo mi svi .. EP" (Split-7″ mit Mars Moles / 1997)
 "Mein Skateboard ist wichtiger als Deutschland" (MCD / 1997)
 "Wir müssen raus" (MCD / 1997)
 "Neulich Nacht" (MCD / 1998)
 "Mommy-EP" (MCD / 1999)
 Allein gegen Alle 7-inch (2000, Epitaph Records)
 "Stay Away from the Good Guys" (MCD, 7-inch / 2000)
 "Tresenlied" (MCD / 2001)
 "Dee Dee Ramone / Terrorgruppe" (split single, 10-inch/MCD / 2002)
 "Angela" (MCD / 2003)
 "Fischertechnik" (SCD / 2004)
 "Bananenrepubklik" (7-inch / 2004)

Live albums
 Terrorgruppe Live (1994)
 Blechdose (2002, Destiny/Aggropop)
 Superblechdose (2017, Destiny/Aggropop)
 ERBROCHENES (Rares & Reste 1993 - 2020) (2022, Aggropop)

Compilations
 Nonstop Aggropop 1977–97 (Gringo Records, 2004)
 Schöne Scheisse (Destiny/Aggropop, 2004)
  Nachtisch – Halbstark in Kreuzberg 1993–2006 (Destiny, 2013)
 Dem Deutschen Volke – Singles 1993–1994 (Plastic Bomb Records, 2013)

External links

Official website

1993 establishments in Germany
2005 disestablishments in Germany
Deutschpunk
German punk rock groups
German rock music groups
Musical groups established in 1993
Musical groups disestablished in 2005
Musical groups from Berlin